Washed Up and Through the Ringer! is a 2001 album by ska punk band Catch 22. It represents a particularly complicated point in the band's history. Vocalist Jeff Davidson left the band in early 2001, leading the remaining band members to carry out a very public search for a replacement vocalist, going so far as to post an open call for would-be singers on the band's website.  Washed Up and Through the Ringer serves as a sort of "history so far" for the band, presenting the 1999 Washed Up! EP in its entirety, three tracks that previously were only available with a limited edition release of Alone in a Crowd, two brand new tracks (one of which, "To Be Continued", was indeed continued as "Chin Up" on 2003's Dinosaur Sounds), and a handful of fan-recorded live tracks from 2000 featuring songs from Alone in a Crowd and Keasbey Nights.  This was the band's last studio release for almost two years, during which time they decided to soldier on with no dedicated vocalist.

Release
Washed Up and Through the Ringer was released in November 2001. In January and February 2002, the band supported the Suicide Machines on their headlining US tour. Following this, the band joined the Victory Records Tour alongside labelmates Grade, Reach the Sky, and Student Rick, until March. In April, the band performed at Skate and Surf Fest. Between September and November, the band toured across the US with Mest and Home Grown.

Track listing

Personnel
Pat Kays - bass guitar
Mike Soprano - trombone, vocals
Ryan Eldred - saxophone, vocals
Chris Greer - drum kit
Kevin Gunther - trumpet, vocals
Pat Calpin - guitar
Jeff Davidson - vocals, tracks 3-18

References

Catch 22 (band) albums
2001 albums
Victory Records albums